Andrew John Crispo (born 1945) is an American former art gallerist and convicted felon. In 1985 Crispo was implicated in the so-called Death Mask Murder of Norwegian fashion student Eigil Dag Vesti. The murder, committed by Crispo's employee Bernard LeGeros, shocked the global art community and has since received wide international coverage by authors and journalists, with writer Gary Indiana noting that Crispo's never being charged in the murder was "one of the most surpassingly ugly things that ever happened in the art world."

Biography
An abused child, Crispo was brought up in a Philadelphia orphanage. He went on to found and run an eponymous high end art gallery on East 57th Street in the famed art deco Fuller Building and had clients such as Baron Hans Heinrich Thyssen-Bornemisza. Over the course of the gallery's history it exhibited such artists as Richard Anuszkiewicz, Richard Pousette-Dart, Charles Burchfield, and Lowell Blair Nesbitt. Often Crispo would write essays for the catalogues which he published to accompany the gallery's exhibitions. Meanwhile, he was involved in S and M activities sometimes at his gallery.

Death Mask Murder, trial, and subsequent criminal cases
One night in 1985, Crispo and his cohort and "executioner" Bernard LeGeros (the son of United Nations Development Fund official John LeGeros) while on a drug-fueled nightlife run picked up a 26 year old Norwegian Fashion Institute of Technology student Eigil Dag Vesti at the Limelight Club. They handcuffed and hooded him and brought him back to LeGeros's parent's estate in the hamlet of Tomkins Cove in the town of Stony Point, New York. Then at some time during that night or the early morning of the following day, LeGeros shot the hooded young man twice with a rifle in a smokehouse on the grounds of the compound. Later Dag Vesti's body was accidentally discovered after having been burned and largely eaten by wild animals, however, due to the black leather mask with a zipper mouth on the deceased young man's face his remains were able to be identified. Had this not been the case it is said the Norwegian's identity may never have been known.

Subsequent to the finding of the body Crispo was implicated but never charged with murder or any other crimes associated with the homicide. However LeGeros was convicted of the murder in the 1985 trial for the crime and served 33 years of a 25 years to life sentence at Attica State Prison in Attica, New York. The case was prosecuted by then Rockland County, New York District Attorney Kenneth Gribetz who later wrote about the case in his book (co-authored with H. Paul Jeffers) Murder Along the Way: A Prosecutor's Personal Account of Fighting Violent Crime in the Suburbs. David France also penned a book about the case, Bag of Toys.

Andrew Crispo was later charged with the kidnap and torture of a 26-year-old man but acquitted. Meanwhile, in between the two trials (one in which he was implicated and one in which he was charged) over violent sexual misbehavior, Crispo was convicted of Federal charges of tax evasion and sentenced to five years in prison. In 1985 Crispo was involved in a dispute with the Solomon R. Guggenheim Museum over Constantin Brâncuși's 1912 sculpture "The Muse" which ended in the museum paying $2 million US for the artwork, at the time believed to be the most ever paid for a 20th-century sculpture. Crispo at that juncture was currently free on $300,000 bail while under indictment on United States Federal tax evasion charges. The bail had been guaranteed by the artwork and was now in turn guaranteed by the newly liquid funds.

Later years
In 1989 while imprisoned on the aforementioned tax evasion conviction Crispo's home in The Hamptons suffered a catastrophic explosion due to a natural gas leak. In 1991 a court ordered that the Long Island, New York utility Lilco pay Andrew Crispo $7.6 million dollars for his lost home and art collection.

From 2016 to 2018, alleged representatives of Andrew Crispo engaged in an extensive online dispute over the provenance of an uncatalogued Picasso sketch bearing a supposed Andrew Crispo gallery label. Andrew Crispo's alleged representatives, claiming to speak directly for Crispo, vehemently denied ever having the Picasso in their collection and declared the sketch a fraud.

Andrew Crispo is a former owner of the historic Pineapple Gate House (known formally as Simmons-Edwards House) in Charleston, South Carolina.

References

1945 births
Living people
People from Philadelphia
American art dealers
American people convicted of tax crimes
People acquitted of kidnapping
1985 murders in the United States